Sadie Sparks is an animated comedy-fantasy television series that premiered on Disney Channel in the UK and Ireland on 20 April 2019. The series was created by Bronagh O'Hanlon and is a co-production between Brown Bag Films in Ireland and Cyber Group Studios in France.

Plot 
Sadie Sparks is set in the fictional American town of Harmony, and revolves around the adventures of Sadie, a teenage girl who discovers she has magical abilities and becomes a magician-in-training. She receives the guidance of a grumpy, magical, talking bunny, Gilbert, who was sent to the human world from the Magical Realm to train Sadie and keep her powers under control, but with this new responsibility, Sadie must also balance high school life.

Throughout the series, it is established and hinted that there is a weak, unstable and dangerous connection between the human world and the Magical Realm, with rifts frequently growing between both worlds that can be closed with an incredibly sticky magic glue substance. These rifts usually cause magical beings and artifacts to fall into Harmony. By the end of the series, the largest rift yet grows between both worlds, and Sadie, with her newfound strengthened magical abilities, manages to close it while risking her life, encouraged by her friends' immense support. The Wardens of Wizardry are still left fearing that this will be the first of larger rifts to come.

Characters

Main 
 Sadie Josephine Sparks (voiced by Georgia Lock) is a 14-year-old girl who realizes she's a magician-in-training. She can be excitable, helpful but often lazy. However, she always likes to use her magical abilities for personal gain or to help her friends, even if there are consequences. In response to shocking situations, Sadie sprouts her own personal catchphrase of "Oh, my giddy!", a line created by head writer Rebecca Hobbs. Gradually over the course of the series, Sadie struggles with and doubts her wizardry potential, and eventually masters her now amplified abilities. Sadie's characteristics were inspired by those of O'Hanlon and Hobbs.
 Gilbert (voiced by Rufus Hound) is an ancient 700-year-old rabbit who trains Sadie in her wizard skills. Although he is grumpy, sarcastic and harsh, deep down, he can more often than not be fun-loving and understanding. Being a mentor of the most well-known wizards of all time, he typically has high expectations for Sadie, and becomes frustrated by the problems caused by her magic. Gilbert is shown to live in a black magician's hat with a purple ribbon, which leads directly to his library-like apartment in the Magical Realm. He is also the mascot of Harmony High; this position grants him special access to the school while also keeping his mystical nature secret. When he's not mentoring Sadie or supporting Harmony High's basketball team, he usually watches his favourite TV series, a melodrama called "Best Frenemies".
 Teepee (voiced by Joshua LeClair) is one of Sadie's friends. He is an overweight, fun-loving teenage boy who loves pop-culture, comic books and sci-fi movies; because of these interests, he usually fantasizes about becoming or meeting a superhero or giant monster. He is fully aware of Sadie being a wizard and helps her with her magical needs.
 Lulu (voiced by Dominique Moore) is Sadie's best friend. She is African-American and is a very shy girl, but she is incredibly smart and knowledgeable with a short temper. She also loves cats, and is frequently caught watching popular cat videos on the internet. Like Teepee, she knows Sadie is a wizard and helps her with her magical needs.

Recurring 
 Sam (voiced by Sammy Moore) is Sadie's love interest and captain of the school basketball team. Multiple times in the series, Sadie attempts to romantically pursue Sam, but her magic always complicates the situations. However, Sam also, but secretly, loves Sadie, and by the episode "Groundhog Date", they are officially a couple.
 Valerie "Val" Garcia (voiced by Laura Aikman) is Sadie's rival. She is most likely of Latina descent. She will take any opportunity to make Sadie's life miserable, and is selfishly willing to make everything go her way. She also has a crush on Sam, but only for his popularity, unlike Sadie who loves him for who he really is. Deep down, Val can be truly sympathetic and caring for others' well-being, as revealed in "The Double Dare Scare".
 Blaine (voiced by Tyger Drew-Honey) is Sadie's magician rival. He is a British wizard who is cocky, immensely lazy and constantly ridicules Sadie as well as complicating her magic-related tasks, believing he is much better than her. But deep down, Blaine has a crush on Sadie, and cares for her abundantly. He also comes from a long line of dark wizards.
 Cornelius (voiced by Craig Revel Horwood) is a talking magical snake who is Blaine's scorny mentor. He makes long hissing noises every time he pronounces an s sound, and has a love-hate relationship with Gilbert. Antithesizing Gilbert, he lives within a red baseball hat, and often spends his days in a glass container in the school's science lab.
 Selina Sparks (voiced by Laura Aikman) is the mother of Sadie and Max and the local journalist of Harmony. Although she is frequently stressed out about her job and is constantly yelled at by her boss, she loves and supports her daughter no matter what. Like Gilbert, she is a fan of Best Frenemies, and bears a strong resemblance to one of the characters, Diana.
 Maxwell "Max" Sparks (voiced by Joshua LeClair) is Sadie's annoying younger brother who is an aspiring scientist, although his inventions always go awry. He also has a crush on Lulu.
 Principal Winifred Eugenia Covert (voiced by Morwenna Banks) is the small but bossy, powerful and conniving headmistress of Harmony High. When she's not making the lives of the students of Harmony High miserable, she secretly works for a government agency simply referred to as "the Department", and is obsessed with finding proof of magic, but her attempts always fail her, especially when it comes to getting the department to spot the mystical activity in Harmony. She also has a hatred for rabbits, and tries to get rid of Gilbert whenever she has the chance. In the series finale, "Oh-My-Giddy!", Covert discovers that Sadie's a wizard and plans on exposing her, only to be held captive in the Magical Realm. Principal Covert was inspired by O'Hanlon's secondary school vice-principal, who she describes as "a small woman who was a real power house. I respected her and was terrified of her at the same time".
 Miss Lacey (voiced by Dominique Moore) is Sadie's teacher at school, who teaches a variety of subjects, such as English, History and Drama. She is very optimistic, kind and peaceful. Formerly a student at Harmony High in the 1990s, she's hinted to have travelled across the world.
 Coach Procter is the gym teacher at Harmony High, who is very strict, goofy but quite prideful about sports. Much like Covert, he enjoys taunting and ridiculing his students, pressuring them into completing difficult sports-related tasks. He also has a crush on Miss Lacey, even though she is completely uninterested in him.
 Tammy and Trixie (voiced by Laura Aikman) are identical twins, cheerleaders and Val's best friends. Supportive of Val through and through, the pair are always delightful and up-beat, yet much like Val, can be sassy and cruel towards Sadie and her friends. Although they have no physical features that tell them apart, the twin with the more raspy, deeper voice is Tammy, and the twin with the more clear, high-pitched voice is Trixie.
 Vincent is one of the three Wardens of Wizardry. He is an elderly and wise man who greatly resembles Albus Dumbledore from Harry Potter.
 Madge is one of the three Wardens of Wizardry. She is an elderly woman who loves knitting, and is very fond of Sadie, strongly believing in her potential as an amazing wizard. In "Mentor Mayhem, she went under the guise of Purrpetua, a magical cat who is a lazy and unhelpful mentor, to help Sadie and Gilbert re-build their bond.
 Mordecai is one of the three Wardens of Wizardry. He is a large, blue beast who is quite spiteful towards Sadie, and is more supportive of Blaine's wizardry potential.
 Doug has large, muscular, gorilla-like figure, but is very soft inside. He is Sam's best friend and a member of the school basketball team.
 Melvin Perry (voiced by Dan Renton Skinner) is a socially awkward and shy boy in Sadie's class who is shown to be quite interested in nature and preserving the environment and wildlife.
 Nolan Esquire (voiced by Dan Renton Skinner) is an intelligent yet rude boy in Sadie's class, and often rivals Lulu. He also commentates Harmony High's sporting events. He was previously known as Melvin Melsworth in "The Need for Speed".
 Dex is an African-American boy in Sadie's class. He is Mia's boyfriend and a member of the school basketball team.
 Mia (voiced by Kristina Yee) is an Asian-American nasally-voiced girl in Sadie's class. She supposedly loves music, as she is often seen wearing headphones, and DJs in "Groundhog Date". She is also Dex's girlfriend.
 Jake is Sam's relaxed and determined father who owns Harmony's popular smoothie bar, Juicy Jake's, and wishes for a more united community within the town.
 Agent Whipple (voiced by Laura Aikman) and Agent Pettigrew (referred to as Agent Periwinkle in "Mascot Trouble") are two agents from the department who grow increasingly bothered of Covert's attempts to make them help her investigation for magical activity in Harmony. In the series finale, they finally believe all of Covert's accusations upon seeing a giant mystical rift between the human world and the Magical Realm.

Minor 
The Guardian of the Labyrinth is a giant octopus monster who is in charge of the many lost, banned and restricted magical items in the Labyrinth of the Lost and Doomed. He often terrifies people with his loud voice and highly threatening procedures. With Sadie's help, he transforms into the teenage boy Cyril whenever he completely enters the human world.
Egbert is a cowardly green dragon who lives in Harmony's caves, and is often comforted by his teddy bear Clarence. In the series finale, he moves back to the Magical Realm.  
Ank is a pharaoh from ancient Egypt brought into the present by Sadie. He is selfish and egotistical, but also wondrous of the modern world.
Lance Lightning is fictional superhero whose action figure was brought to life by Sadie. He's very protective of Sadie, but also willing to harm anyone potentially threatening.
Gah is baby monster from the Magical Realm who Sadie once took care of. He re-appears in the Funny Ol' Bunny short of the same name.
Gah's mother is very protective and loving for her son. She also makes a cameo in the show's opening, and Teepee transforms into her appearance in "Magic vs. Aliens".
Zaine is Blaine's cousin who is willing to use dark magic to make his father notice him.
 Luke is Sam's toddler brother who Sadie regularly has to babysit and occasionally gets caught up in her magic antics.
Grimaldo is an ancient wizard who was trapped in a book several years ago because of his unbearable yet hilarious jokes and pranks.
The Whatevs are an unseen but frequently mentioned girl group that Sadie idolizes. 
Anna Catlova is a Russian professional dancer who Gilbert idolizes, even though she is actually a thief who steals worldwide known prized items.
Dave is Selina's cameraman.
Sloane Walker is a famous actor who portrays the twins Jerry and Terry Johnson in "Best Frenemies".
Mr Stormweather is Selina's boss at the TV station who often shouts at her through the phone.

Production 
When creator Bronagh O'Hanlon entered the animation industry, she wanted to produce cartoons starring more people that looked like her. When initially conceptualizing the series, O'Hanlon wondered why rabbits came out of magician's hats, and created a jaded wizard-mentoring rabbit who worked with the likes of Merlin and Rasputin; after a slump in his career, he started working with his complete antithesis: a young energetic teenage girl, who he would slowly, but surely, warm up to. The show was initially pitched in 2009, alongside a currently lost pitch pilot that depicts Sadie and Gilbert's relationship and the art-style changes, but it was never picked up. Executives originally advised O'Hanlon to make the protagonist male, and that the show's target demographic, 11-year-old girls, would only be watching tween sitcoms, but O'Hanlon deduced that girls would only watch sitcoms due to the lack of animated programming targeted towards them. Since the series was shelved, O'Hanlon began working on shows such as Doc McStuffins and Henry Hugglemonster. The idea was revisited in 2013, when a toy manufacturer requested a show from Brown Bag with a synopsis almost identical to O'Hanlon's show, and the series was soon greenlit. The show was originally going to be animated in 2D only, but since most animated shows produced in Ireland at the time were in CGI, 3D designs were soon brought into consideration. The test pilot was later re-animated with the current CGI Sadie model to better demonstrate the series to clients, but this second version still has not resurfaced.

When the show was in its early stages of production, it was titled Gilbert and Allie, with Sadie originally being named Allie, however, the name had to be changed to avoid confusion with another Disney Channel show, Austin & Ally.

Episodes
The first season has 52 11-minute episodes.  When episodes are distributed by Disney, every two episodes are combined into a 22-minute long episode.

Shorts 
Two series of shorts were also created and released alongside the show in 2019; one simply title Sadie Sparks Shorts, which exclusively uses the 3D segments of the series with original voice-over, and a second titled Sadie Sparks: Funny Ol' Bunny, which features original 2D animated content. Disney Channel UK uploaded the first two Sadie Sparks Shorts to their YouTube channel. Although the English versions of most of the shorts were missing for some time, both of these shorts series were released on Disney+ in the UK on September 15, 2021.

Sadie Sparks Shorts

Sadie Sparks: Funny Ol' Bunny

Broadcast 
Sadie Sparks premiered on Disney Channel in the UK and Ireland on 20 April 2019, however the first two episodes were released earlier on YouTube on 9 April. In France, the series premiered on Disney Channel on 26 May. In Latin America and Brazil, the series premiered on Discovery Kids on 20 July 2019. In South Africa, the show premiered on 3 August 2019. In Australia, the series airs on ABC Me.

In Canada, the show premiered on Family Channel on 6 January 2020. In Spain and Portugal, the series premiered on 13 January 2020 on the Disney Channel within those territories. The series also aired on POP TV from the 27th of July 2020. On 1 August 2020, the series premiered on Disney Channel in Bulgaria, the Czech Republic, Hungary, Poland and Romania. In Ireland, the series premiered on TG4 with Irish-language dubbing on 2 October 2020. In Turkey, the series premiered on 2 November 2020 on Disney Channel, where it has grown a large fanbase.

In 2021, the series premiered in Finland on Yle Areena on 26 March, on Disney+ throughout western Europe on 14 May, and in Japan on Disney Channel on 4 September. On 18 September 2021, the series premiered on Pixel TV in Ukraine. On 23 September 2021, the series premiered in the United States on the Kidoodle TV app. As of 31 October 2021, the series also airs on Yle TV2 as part of the "Galaxi" programming block for children ages 7 and up.

In 2022, the series premiered on Super3 with Catalan-language dubbing on 10 January. It was made available on Disney+ in South Africa on the 18th of May.

References

External links 
 

2010s French animated television series
2019 French television series debuts
2019 Irish television series debuts
French children's animated comedy television series
French children's animated fantasy television series
Irish children's animated comedy television series
Irish children's animated fantasy television series
English-language television shows
Disney Channel original programming
Animated television series about siblings
Animated television series about rabbits and hares
French computer-animated television series
Teen animated television series
Television series by Brown Bag Films
Disney Channel (British and Irish TV channel) original programming
Disney Channels Worldwide original programming